Hubertia is a genus of flowering plants in the daisy family.

 Species

References

Senecioneae
Asteraceae genera
Biota of the Indian Ocean